Daniel Addoquaye Addo (born 23 April 1985 in Accra) is a Ghanaian football midfielder who played for Ashanti Gold SC.

Career
Addo joined in June 2008 from Power F.C. to Heart of Lions and stands in Ghana Premier League All Star team. On 2 January 2008 was speculated with a move from Heart of Lions link to Red Star Belgrade and he moved to Serbia in February and stayed until June 2008.  However, he failed to make an appearance in the Serbian SuperLiga with Red Star. In summer 2009 he signed with Ashanti Gold SC, he scored here in his debut his first goal for his new club.

Position
Addo can play as attacking midfielder or forward.

International
He was on Ghana's player list for the 2008 African Cup of Nations but was cut from the list on the last day of preparations. On 13 November 2007 he was called up for the Black Stars.

References

1985 births
Living people
Ghanaian footballers
Ghana international footballers
Association football forwards
Footballers from Accra
Ashanti Gold SC players
Heart of Lions F.C. players
Power F.C. players
Red Star Belgrade footballers
Expatriate footballers in Serbia